Karl Wilhelm Scheibler (1 September 1820 – 13 April 1881) was a German-born Polish industrialist, businessman and textile manufacturer.

Biography 
Scheibler was born in Montjoie (today Monschau) in the Prussian Province of Jülich-Cleves-Berg into a family of textile fabricants. He attended school in Monschau and Krefeld and received a practical education at his uncle's Worsted factory at Verviers (Belgium). In 1839, he worked for Société anonyme John Cockerill, a well known producer of machinery construction at that time.

Because of the riots of the Spring of Nations in 1848 Scheibler decided to leave Germany and moved to Ozorkow in Congress Poland, where his uncle, Friedrich Schlösser, had operated a textile factory since 1816. After Schlösser's death he became its commercial director. Scheibler married Anna née Werner, a niece of Schlösser, on 16 September 1854. In 1852, Scheibler and his partner Julius Schwartz bought a plot at Łódź and started to build a machinery factory. In October 1854, Schwartz sold his share to Scheibler for 10,000 rubles, making him the sole owner of the factory.

In 1855, Scheibler founded a spinning mill with 34 frames and a steam engine of 40 horsepower. In 1857, Scheibler employed 180 labourers and earned a turnover of 305,100 rubles in 1860. Scheibler made large profits after cotton prices in Europe increased because of the American Civil War and sold his stock at triple the price. He became known as the "King of the Cotton and Linen Empires of Łódź". In 1870, 1,911 employees worked in his factory, which was the third largest (9.3 percent) cotton producer of Poland.

Scheibler's factory continued to prosper and he bought several smaller mills in the districts of Źarki and Księży Młyn. After a fire destroyed the factory at Księży Młyn in 1874, Scheibler rebuilt it with 88.000 spindles and built his own "Kingdom" of Księży Młyn with houses for 321 families, a fire station, schools, shops and a hospital Scheibler was known for his social engagement and supported the foundation of a municipal credit association, the Commercial Bank of Łódź (Bank Handlowy) in 1872 as well as the construction of a Lutheran and a Catholic Church.

In 1880, he transformed his enterprise into a stock corporation with a share capital of 9 million Ruble.

Scheibler died on 13 April 1881 in Łódź and was buried at the Protestant Cemetery of Łódź in a mausoleum designed by the Warsaw architects Joseph Dziekonski and Edward Lilop.

Awards 
 1870 Order of the White Eagle
 1876 Gold Medal in Warsaw
 1878 Great Gold Medal at the Paris World's Fair
 Order of Saint Stanislaus First and Second class

Cultural associations 
Andrzej Wajda's movie The Promised Land was filmed inside Scheibler's Palace, which is today the location of the Cinematographic Museum of the National Film School in Łódź.

The figure of the German industrialist Heinz Huntze, a character of The Brothers Ashkenazi, is loosely based on Karl Wilhelm Scheibler.

References

External links 
 Scheibler's palace at Łódź 
 Kinomuzeum.pl showing some inside views of Scheibler's Palace

1820 births
1881 deaths
People from Monschau
Businesspeople from North Rhine-Westphalia
Businesspeople from Łódź
German emigrants to Poland